Ruggers 34 RFC is a Turkish rugby team based in Istanbul. The 34 comes from the car registration plate number for the Bostancı neighborhood, where they are located.

External links
Ruggers 34 RFC

Turkish rugby union teams